Donald Clarke Sweeney (born August 17, 1966) is a Canadian former ice hockey defenceman who played over 1,100 games in the National Hockey League (NHL), mostly with the Boston Bruins. He ranks among the top ten in many Bruins team statistics, including fourth overall in total games played. After retiring from hockey following the 2003–04 season, he worked briefly as a broadcaster before rejoining the Bruins as a team executive in 2006.

He is the current general manager of the Bruins, a position he has held since May 2015 after replacing Peter Chiarelli.

Early life
Sweeney grew up in St. Stephen, New Brunswick. In high school, he skated for St. Paul's School in Concord, New Hampshire. He was drafted to the NHL by the Bruins out of high school, 166th overall in the eighth round, but he postponed his NHL career in order to attend college. He decided to attend Harvard University, where he lived in Grays Hall during his freshman year. He played hockey for four years there for the Crimson ice hockey team, where he was named an NCAA East All-American and an ECAC First Team All-Star in 1988.

Playing career
Sweeney made his NHL debut during the 1988–89 season, having spent half of the year with the American Hockey League (AHL)'s Maine Mariners. In the following season, he helped the Bruins in the NHL to win the Prince of Wales Trophy by scoring six points in 21 games until they finally lost to the Edmonton Oilers in the Stanley Cup Finals.

In 1992–93, Sweeney played in all 84 games and put up 36 points and ended up winning the Adams Trophy that year. In both the 1994–95 and 1995–96 seasons he was second amongst Boston defenceman with 22 and 28 points, respectively. In 1997–98, Sweeney missed the last 23 games of the season with a fractured shoulder that he suffered on March 1. In the next season, Sweeney achieved 205 hits and 85 blocked shots in 81 games. In the 1999–2000 season, he had 301 hits and 84 blocked shots, and in the following year he had 172 hits in 72 games and in 2000–01 season he contributed 18 points in 81 games. In the 2002–03 season, Sweeney scored only eight points in 67 games as his team nestled into third place in the division. On November 14 that year, he also played in his 1,000th NHL game.

Sweeney played a total of 15 seasons and 1,051 games for Boston, being one of just four players—and two defencemen—in team history to play in over 1,000 games.

Since July 2006, he has ranked third on the Bruins' all-time games played list, while amongst all-time club defencemen, he ranks tenth in career goals (52), eighth in assists (210) and ninth in points (262).

Sweeney ended his playing career in 2003–04 as a member of the Dallas Stars. He retired with NHL totals of 52 goals and 221 assists for 273 points and 681 penalty minutes in 1,115 career regular season games. He added nine goals and ten assists for 19 points with 81 penalty minutes in 108 career playoff games.

Executive career
Following the firing of Peter Chiarelli as Bruins' general manager on April 15, 2015, speculation had surrounded Sweeney's status within the Bruins front office, as Sweeney's early May 2015 meeting with Bruins head coach Claude Julien may have been an indication that as well as Julien remaining as the Bruins' head coach into the 2015–16 season, Sweeney could possibly been in line to become the Bruins' next general manager. On May 20, the Bruins named Sweeney as the team's general manager.

On June 26, at the 2015 NHL Entry Draft and in his first major move as GM, Sweeney traded restricted free agent defenceman Dougie Hamilton to the Calgary Flames in exchange for the Draft's 15th overall pick (used to select Zachary Senyshyn) and two second-round draft picks. Shortly after, he traded long-time Bruins forward Milan Lucic to the Los Angeles Kings in exchange for the 13th overall pick (used to select Jakub Zbořil), Martin Jones and Colin Miller. Four days later, on June 30, Sweeney then traded Jones to the San Jose Sharks for a first-round pick in 2016 (29th overall, used to select Trent Frederic)

Sweeney guided the Bruins return to prominence in the 2018–19 season, winning the Eastern Conference Finals and securing a berth at the 2019 Stanley Cup Finals against the St. Louis Blues. Despite losing to the Blues, Sweeney was recognized as the NHL General Manager of the Year Award at the NHL Awards Ceremony in Las Vegas, Nevada, on Jun 19, 2019.

Personal life
Sweeney and his wife, former figure skater Christine Hough, have twin sons, Jarrod and Tyler.

Career statistics

Regular season and playoffs

International

Awards and honours

See also
List of NHL players with 1000 games played

References

External links

1966 births
Living people
Boston Bruins draft picks
Boston Bruins executives
Boston Bruins players
Boston Bruins scouts
Boston Bruins announcers
Canadian ice hockey defencemen
Dallas Stars players
Harvard Crimson men's ice hockey players
Ice hockey people from New Brunswick
Maine Mariners players
People from St. Stephen, New Brunswick
New Brunswick Sports Hall of Fame inductees
AHCA Division I men's ice hockey All-Americans